Mount Gilead Downtown Historic District is a national historic district located at Mount Gilead, Montgomery County, North Carolina. The district encompasses 25 contributing buildings in the central business district of Mount Gilead.  It was developed between 1900 and 1955 and includes notable examples of Early Commercial and Romanesque Revival style architecture.  Notable buildings include the Harris Building (1916), Mt. Gilead Town Hall and Annex (1939, 1955, 1960), Mt. Gilead Post Office (1910), First United Methodist Church (1910, 1960), First Baptist Church (1919), Randolph Knitting Company (1910), and Kennedy's Taxi Stand (1920s).

It was added to the National Register of Historic Places in 2005.

References

Historic districts on the National Register of Historic Places in North Carolina
Romanesque Revival architecture in North Carolina
Buildings and structures in Montgomery County, North Carolina
National Register of Historic Places in Montgomery County, North Carolina